The Denver Nuggets are an American professional basketball team based in Denver, Colorado. The Nuggets compete in the National Basketball Association (NBA) as a member club of the league's Western Conference Northwest Division. The team was founded as the Denver Larks in 1967 as a charter franchise of the American Basketball Association (ABA), but changed its name to Rockets before the first season. It changed its name again to the Nuggets in 1974. The team joined the NBA in 1976 after the ABA–NBA merger. They first participated in the NBA draft in 1977.

Selections

Notes

References
General
Denver Nuggets' All-time Draft Choices at NBA.com
Denver Nuggets Draft Register at Basketball-Reference.com

Specific

 
National Basketball Association draft
draft history